Penicillium alicantinum is a fungus species of the genus of Penicillium which was isolated from the atmosphere in Madrid.

See also
List of Penicillium species

References

Further reading
 

alicantinum
Fungi described in 1980